Musab Al-Battat (Arabic: مصعب البطاط; born 12 November 1993) is a Palestinian professional footballer who plays as a defender for Ceramica Cleopatra FC.

International career

International goals
Scores and results list Palestine's goal tally first.

External links

References

1993 births
Living people
Palestinian footballers
Palestine international footballers
Association football defenders
Shabab Al-Dhahiriya SC players
Ahli Al-Khaleel players
2015 AFC Asian Cup players
Footballers at the 2014 Asian Games
2019 AFC Asian Cup players
Asian Games competitors for Palestine
West Bank Premier League players
Palestinian expatriate sportspeople in Egypt
Expatriate footballers in Egypt